The 1982 Sam Houston State Bearkats football team represented Sam Houston State University as a member of the Lone Star Conference (LSC) during the 1982 NCAA Division II football season. Led by first-year head coach Ron Randleman, the Bearkats compiled an overall record of 3–8 with a mark of 1–6 in conference play, and finished eighth in the LSC.

Schedule

References

Sam Houston State
Sam Houston Bearkats football seasons
Sam Houston State Bearkats football